Chiara Marletto is a theoretical physicist at Wolfson College, Oxford. She is a pioneer in the field of constructor theory, a generalization of the quantum theory of information.

Life 
Marletto grew up in Turin. She graduated from the Polytechnic University of Torino, and the University of Oxford, where she studied with Artur Ekert.

Together with David Deutsch, she has developed constructor theory. She is a member of New Frontiers Quantum Hub.

Works

References

Further reading
 Quantum computers are revealing an unexpected new theory of reality, New Scientist
 Reconstructing physics: The universe is information, New Scientist

External links 
 
Constructor Theory website
 Chiara Marletto Interview Part One, 7 October 2020

 

Academics of the University of Oxford
21st-century Italian physicists
Italian women physicists
Scientists from Turin
Quantum information scientists
Theoretical physicists
Living people
Year of birth missing (living people)
Italian expatriates in England